The Ovaltine Cafe is a traditional diner in the Downtown Eastside neighbourhood of Vancouver, British Columbia, Canada, known for its traditional decor. The cafe was opened in 1942 and has served as a set for movies and television shows that want to film in a restaurant with an old-fashioned appearance.

On September 15, 2018, Craig Moss, a travel writer with the London newspaper The Telegraph, in consultation with a team of experts, published a list of the world's 50 best cafes, which included the Ovaltine.

Keith McKellar devoted a chapter to the cafe in his book Neon Eulogy, calling it "easily Vancouver's most prized antique cafe."

Randall Wong, the first Chinese-Canadian federal judge in Canada, worked at the Ovaltine in his youth. At that time the Ovaltine was near a court and a police station, and Wong attributed his interest in the law to his conversations with patrons who worked in law enforcement.

References

Restaurants in Vancouver